Kinzie Hansen (born October 12, 2001) is an American college softball player for the Oklahoma Sooners, and a member of the United States women's national softball team.

Early life
Hansen was born to Jason and Nicole Hansen. She played travel ball for the OC Batbusters, and finished the 2018 summer with a .460 batting average, 37 hits, 23 RBIs, 21 runs, 11 home runs and a .990 fielding percentage, and helped lead her team to a national runner-up finish.

High school career
Hansen attended Norco High School in Norco, California. During her freshman year in 2016, she hit .426 with seven home runs, a team-best 37 RBI, 18 walks and a .525 on-base percentage. Following the season, she was named to the Big VIII League first team, and was the only underclassman to be named to the Riverside Press-Enterprise All-Inland first team. She was also named CalHiSports State Freshman of the Year. During her sophomore year in 2017, she had the team’s second-best batting average at .470, and led the team with 43 RBI. Following the season, she was named CalHiSports State Sophomore of the Year. As a junior in 2018, she posted a .596 batting average, 31 hits, 29 RBIs, 11 runs scored, four home runs and a .992 fielding percentage and helped lead her team to the CIF Championship. Following the season she was named CalHiSports State Junior of the Year and HSGameTime Softball Player of the Year. She was also named a first-team All-American, the CIF MVP, the league MVP and the Press Enterprise Softball Player of the Year.

College career
Hansen made her collegiate debut for Oklahoma on February 6, 2020, in a game against Nevada, where she went 2-for-5 with four RBIs. She finished her freshman year in a season that was shortened due to the COVID-19 pandemic with 24 starts, including 22 at first base, and led the Sooners with 26 RBI, ranked second on the team with 31 hits and 11 walks and fourth on the team in batting average at .413. She also had a perfect fielding percentage and 152 putouts at first base.

During her sophomore year in 2021, she started 58 games, and batted .438 with 24 home runs, nine doubles and 66 RBIs. Her 24 home runs ranked fifth in the country. Defensively, she recorded 279 putouts and 21 assists with just three errors for .990 fielding percentage. On February 11, 2021, she went 5-for-5 in a game against UTEP, with two home runs, and three RBI. Her five hits tied the single-game program record for hits. During the 2021 Big 12 Conference softball tournament, she recorded five home runs in three games, with eight RBI and a 2.100 slugging percentage. She was subsequently named to the all-tournament team and the Most Outstanding Player of the Big 12 Tournament. During the 2021 Women's College World Series she batted .357 with three home runs, one double and eight RBI, to help lead her team to the Women's College World Series championship. She was also named to the All-tournament Team.

During her junior year in 2022, she started 41 games, after missing part of the season due to injury. She finished the season with a .273 batting average, 33 hits, 29 RBI and eight home runs. During the 2022 Women's College World Series title-clinching championship game, she went 2-for-3 with a three-run home run to help Oklahoma win their second consecutive national championship.

National team career
On January 7, 2022, she was named a member of the United States women's national softball team for the 2022 World Games.

References 

Living people
2001 births
Oklahoma Sooners softball players
People from Norco, California
Softball players from California
Competitors at the 2022 World Games
World Games gold medalists
World Games medalists in softball